The Luxembourg women's national under-16 basketball team is a national basketball team of Luxembourg, administered by the Luxembourg Basketball Federation.
It represents the country in women's international under-16 basketball competitions.

The team participated 15 times at the FIBA U16 Women's European Championship Division B. They also won three medals at the FIBA U16 Women's European Championship Division C.

See also
Luxembourg women's national basketball team
Luxembourg women's national under-18 basketball team
Luxembourg men's national under-16 basketball team

References

External links
Archived records of Luxembourg team participations

Basketball in Luxembourg
Basketball teams in Luxembourg
Women's national under-16 basketball teams
Basketball